Mekki may refer to:

 Adam Mekki (born 1991), English footballer
 Amin Mekki Medani, (born 1942-2018) Sudanese Human Rights Lawyer, President of the Confederation of Sudanese Civil Society, Vice President of Civil Society Initiative, and former President of the Sudan Human Rights Monitor (SHRM).
 Hatem El Mekki (1918–2003), Tunisian painter
 Tarak Mekki (born 1958), Tunisian businessman and political figure
 Yusif Kuwa Mekki, (1945–2001) was a Sudanese revolutionary, rebel commander and politician